Daryl Waud (born August 24, 1993) is a former Canadian football defensive lineman & currently a professional lacrosse player for the Philadelphia Wings of the National Lacrosse League. He was drafted by the Toronto Argonauts in the second round, 12th overall, in the 2015 CFL Draft and signed with the team on May 28, 2015. He played CIS football for the Western Mustangs. He is currently on the NLL roster for Panther City Lacrosse Club.

References

External links
Philadelphia Wings bio
Toronto Argonauts bio

Living people
1993 births
Canadian football defensive linemen
Canadian lacrosse players
Players of Canadian football from Ontario
Sportspeople from Hamilton, Ontario
Toronto Argonauts players
Western Mustangs football players
Ottawa Redblacks players